The Palauan slender gecko (Hemiphyllodactylus ganoklonis) is a species of gecko. It is endemic to Palau.

References

Hemiphyllodactylus
Reptiles described in 2010
Reptiles of Oceania
Endemic fauna of Palau